Flannán mac Toirrdelbaig was an Irish saint who lived in the 7th century and was the son of an Irish chieftain, Toirdhealbhach of Dál gCais. He entered Mo Lua's monastery at Killaloe, where it is believed he became an Abbot. He is remembered as a great preacher.

He made a pilgrimage to Rome where Pope John IV consecrated him as the first Bishop of Killaloe, of which he is the Patron Saint.  He also preached in the Hebrides. His feast day is 18 December.

See also
Roman Catholic Diocese of Killaloe
Diocese of Limerick and Killaloe (Church of Ireland)
St. Flannan's College
Flannan Isles

References

 

People from County Clare
7th-century Irish abbots
7th-century Christian saints
Medieval Irish saints
Medieval saints of Munster
Year of birth unknown
Dál gCais